Diphetogo "Dipsy" Selolwane (born 27 January 1978) is a Botswana former professional footballer who played as a midfielder. He has also played as a striker in Major League Soccer.

Club career
Selolwane first played for Gaborone United in the Botswana Premier League. After playing college soccer at St. Louis University and being named first-team All-American in 2001, Selolwane was drafted 36th overall in the 2002 MLS Superdraft by the Chicago Fire. Selolwane was traded to Real Salt Lake after the 2004 MLS season but failed to make an impact and was released during the 2005 season. In four years of action in MLS, he scored three goals.

He returned to Africa, first to Botswana and then to the South African Premier Soccer League.  His first PSL club was Santos, before moving to Jomo Cosmos, after having a very disappointing 2006–07 season. He signed with Ezenkosi for the 2007–08 season, but made only two appearances and joined Ajax Cape Town in early 2008.  His PSL career flourished at Ajax, where he was converted to a midfielder and earned a July 2010 move to league champions Supersport United.

International career
Selolwane is also a significant player for the Botswana national football team. On 28 January 2012, Selolwane converted a penalty, which temporarily equalised the score in the 1:6 loss against Guinea. This was the first ever goal scored by the national team in a major international tournament.

Personal life

Selolwane and actor Marang Molosiwa announced that they were having a child in June 2019. This was Selolwane's second child. The pair tied the knot recently and were showered with praises and congratulatory messages after Dipsy shared a photo of him and his newly wedded bride.

International goals
Scores and results list Botswana's goal tally first.

See also 

Aaron Mokoena
Botswana National Football team

References

External links

Hail 'Dipsy' Selolwane – The Botswana Gazette

1978 births
Living people
Botswana footballers
Botswana expatriate footballers
Botswana international footballers
Association football forwards
Chicago Fire FC players
Real Salt Lake players
Botswana expatriate sportspeople in Denmark
Botswana expatriate sportspeople in South Africa
Botswana expatriate sportspeople in the United States
Vejle Boldklub players
Jomo Cosmos F.C. players
Saint Louis Billikens men's soccer players
Cape Town Spurs F.C. players
People from Gaborone
Association football midfielders
Santos F.C. (South Africa) players
Gaborone United S.C. players
Expatriate men's footballers in Denmark
Expatriate soccer players in South Africa
SuperSport United F.C. players
University of Pretoria F.C. players
2012 Africa Cup of Nations players
Expatriate soccer players in the United States
Major League Soccer players
Chicago Fire FC draft picks
All-American men's college soccer players